Lake Yenişehir (aka Lake Reyhanlı) is a small lake in Turkey.

It is fed by underground water. The lake is an artificial lake . It was formed in 1865  to reduce marsh land and later to provide water to the city. Now the lake is a popular picnic area of Reyhanlı citizens.

References

Yenisehir
Landforms of Hatay Province
1865 establishments in the Ottoman Empire
Reyhanlı District